Catherine D'Ovidio (1959 – 28 August 2020) was a French bridge player. She was 61 years old.

Bridge accomplishments

Wins
 World Mixed Teams (1) 2004
 Venice Cup (2) 2005, 2011
 North American Bridge Championships (1)
 Wagar Women's Knockout Teams (1) 2013

Runners-up

 World Mixed Teams (1) 2000
 Venice Cup (1) 2001
 North American Bridge Championships (1)
 Machlin Women's Swiss Teams (1) 2010

References

External links
 

1959 births
2020 deaths
French contract bridge players